is a Japanese series of fantasy novels written by Fuyumi Ono and illustrated by Akihiro Yamada. The first entry in the series called The Twelve Kingdoms: Sea of Shadow was published by Kodansha in Japan in 1992; the last Kodansha volume was released in 2001. In 2012 the series was resumed under the Shinchō Bunko line from Shinchosha. Shinchosha has also begun reprinting the older volumes with new cover and interior art from Akihiro Yamada. The first new publication of the series in six years was released in 2019.

The Chinese mythology-influenced books were adapted into an anime television series by Pierrot in 2002. It aired on Japan's NHK from April 2002 to August 2003, and totaled 45 episodes.

The novels were licensed in the United States by Tokyopop and the first four volumes were released between March 2007 and November 2010 as part of their Pop Fiction line. Subsequently, the English license reverted to Kodansha. The entire anime series has been released on DVD and Blu-ray in the United States by Media Blasters, which are now out of print. The license was transferred to Discotek Media, who released the complete series on Blu-ray in 2019.

Plot

Yoko Nakajima, an unhappy high school student, is one day suddenly faced with a strange man who swears allegiance to her. After a battle with demon-like beasts, he then takes her to another world along with two of her classmates. There, her appearance has changed and she can understand the language even though her classmates cannot. But their status as "Kaikyaku" (people who come from Earth) makes them hunted fugitives, so they wander the land of the 12 countries, simply trying to survive and to figure out the reason why they were brought to this world.

Setting
The Twelve Kingdoms tells several stories from the world of the Twelve Kingdoms, located on a group of several islands in another dimension accessible from our world through portals created from naturally-occurring magic (though the other way around is normally impossible). The portals occur in the ocean waters of Japan and China, and every so often will end up dragging someone from our world from those waters to the kingdoms' islands, and/or on rare occasion, pulling an unborn child from the kingdoms into our world, causing them to be born there. On the islands, magic works and societies similar to those of classical Japan and China exist. While the inhabitants of the kingdoms are aware of the existence of our world as the lands of Hourai (Japan) and Kunlun (China), the reverse is not true for any inhabitants of our world. The inhabitants of the kingdoms speak a different language than the languages of our world, both of which can be learned by either side. Only by through extraordinary circumstances can the two worlds affect each other to a respective certain extent.

In this world, there are a total of thirteen lands. At the center of the world lies the Koukai (the Yellow Sea) and Five Mountains where the Gods communicate their will to the Twelve Kingdoms of the world. Each of the Twelve Kingdoms possess their own ruler and its own Kirin, a divine creature which embodies the will of heaven and is entrusted to choose a kingdom's ruler by Tentei: Emperor of Heaven, and serve as the ruler's aide. The ruler will have immortal life as long as they keep the kingdom healthy and their heads are not severed from their body. If the ruler's Kirin dies or is killed, the ruler will die within a year.

The Koukai, known as the Yellow Sea, is surrounded by four inland seas: the Black Sea in the north, the Blue Sea to the east, the Red Sea in the south, and the White Sea to the west. Eight of the Twelve Kingdoms (Kei, En, Ryu, Kyou, Han, Sai, Sou, and Kou) border at least one of these four seas, extending from the center like the petals of a flower.

Publication
There are nine novels in the Twelve Kingdoms series, including two short story collections. The novels are illustrated by Akihiro Yamada. Some of the novels have been published in two or more volume editions such that the total number of volumes is sixteen (as originally released in Japan).

Before she started work on Twelve Kingdoms, Fuyumi Ono wrote  (Kodansha: September 1991, ; Shinchosha reprint: July 2012), a horror novel about a boy from another world. She later worked certain events from this novel into the Twelve Kingdoms series. One short story, published in 1997, accompanied the drama CD for Higashi no Wadatsumi, Nishi no Sōkai and remains uncollected elsewhere. Hisho no Tori and Rakushou no Goku were later collected into a volume of short stories titled Hisho no Tori, along with two new previously unpublished stories in 2013.

U.S. release
On May 11, 2006, U.S. publisher Tokyopop said in an interview with comic book news website Newsarama that it would be publishing the novels under its "Pop Fiction" imprint. The first book was released in March 2007. The first four books have been released.

Media

Anime

The anime adaptation by studio Pierrot aired from April 9, 2002, to August 30, 2003, in Japan on NHK for forty-five episodes. The opening theme is "Juunigenmukyoku" by Kunihiko Ryo while the ending theme is "Getsumei-Fuuei" by Mika Arisaka. The anime series has been released on DVD and Blu-ray in the United States by Media Blasters, which are now out of print. The license was transferred to Discotek Media, who released the complete series on Blu-ray in 2019.

Animanga
Kodansha printed a fifteen-volume "animanga" series in 2002-2004 by combining images from the anime series with printed dialogue and sound effects. It has been released only in Japanese.

Video games
Konami has released in Japan two games based on Twelve Kingdoms, both produced by Takashi Shimomichi. They are Juuni Kokuki: Guren no Shirube Koujin no Michi and Juuni Kokuki: Kakukakutaru Oudou Kouryoku no Uka. Both games contain footage from the anime and many stills of the characters are used during conversation and during battle. The games are sprite-based, with small sprites used on-screen and larger, highly animated sprites used during battle.

Juuni Kokuki: Guren no Shirube Koujin no Michi was released for PlayStation 2 on August 28, 2003. It follows Yoko's journey to becoming Empress of Kei. While classified as an RPG, it is often described as an adventure game. The game was re-released in Konami's The Best lineup on June 9, 2004. Yoko is capable of summoning Keiki's Shirei into battle as well as having additional party members.

Juuni Kokuki: Kakukakutaru Oudou Kouryoku no Uka was released for PlayStation 2 on April 4, 2004, and is a sequel to the first game, continuing with Yoko's problems after she becomes the monarch of Kei. Game data from the first game can be loaded into the second. This game contains more RPG elements than the first with party-/menu-based battles becoming standard. Many of the event scenes are pulled from the novels but there are also scenes made just for the game.

Reception
Kunihiko Ryo's instrumental opening theme “Jūni Genmukyoku” has been praised for its "sweeping score" that suits "the high fantasy series very well." The end of the song has also been praised for having an "exciting" sound similar to later "swashbuckling main themes" for the Pirates of the Caribbean (2003-2011) film soundtracks and The Elder Scrolls IV: Oblivion (2006) video game soundtrack.

References

External links
 Official U.S. site
 Official NHK site
 Shinchosha Official Novel site
 

 
1992 Japanese novels
2002 anime television series debuts
Anime and manga based on novels
Chinese mythology in anime and manga
Discotek Media
High fantasy anime and manga
Films with screenplays by Shō Aikawa
Fuyumi Ono
Isekai anime and manga
Isekai novels and light novels
Japanese fantasy novels
Kodansha books
NHK original programming
Odex
Pierrot (company)
Tokyopop titles